The World Group Play-offs were four ties which involved the losing nations of the World Group first round and the winning nations of the World Group II. Nations that won their play-off ties entered the 2008 World Group, while losing nations joined the 2008 World Group II.

Austria vs.  Israel

Belgium vs. China

Japan vs. Germany

Spain vs. Czech Republic

References

See also
Fed Cup structure

World Group Play-offs